The 2010 Australian Qualifying Grand Prix was the fourth qualifying Gliding Grand Prix for the FAI World Grand Prix 2010-2011.

See also 
 Australian Grand Prix Gliding 2008

External links 
 https://web.archive.org/web/20100529223816/http://www.fai.org/gliding/QSGP2010_2011

Gliding competitions
Grand Prix Gliding 2010
Gliding in Australia
2010 in air sports
Aviation history of Australia